Tamil Nadu State Highway 71A (SH-71A) is a State Highway maintained by the Highways Department of Government of Tamil Nadu. It connects Manapparai with Thuvarankurichi, via Ammachathiram in Tamil Nadu.

Route
The route is from ManapparaiThuvarankurichi, via Ammachathiram.

See also 
 Highways of Tamil Nadu

References 

State highways in Tamil Nadu
Road transport in Tiruchirappalli